The 2002 Samsung-PBA Commissioner's Cup Finals was the best-of-7 basketball championship series of the 2002 PBA Commissioner's Cup and the conclusion of the conference's playoffs. The Batang Red Bull Thunder and Talk 'N Text Phone Pals played for the 82nd championship contested by the league.

Batang Red Bull Thunder wins their 2nd PBA title and retain the crown they won in the same conference last season with a 4-3 series victory over the Talk 'N Text Phone Pals.

Willie Miller won on his First Season MVP and First Finals MVP in Commissioner's Cup Finals.

Series scoring summary

Games summary

Game 1

Jerald Honeycutt poured 22 of his 32 points in the final half as the Phone Pals dictated the tempo up to the last minute. Lordy Tugade drilled three straight triples to push the Thunder to within 98-101, but wrong decisions in the end dash their bid, Tugade converted a twinner with three seconds left instead of shooting a potential game-tying triple.

Game 2

Tony Lang turn in a game-high 37 points and joined hands with Willie Miller in the final half to power the Thunder to a victory and redeem himself from a lackluster 14-point output in the first game of the series. Willie Miller, Jimwell Torion and Junthy Valenzuela scored crucial three-pointers in the third and fourth quarter with Miller knocking in 11 of his 14 points in that span, including three triples that broke the backs of the Phone Pals, which lost Victor Pablo early in the game due to a knee injury when he fell on his back while trying to stop Junthy Valenzuela underneath the basket.

Game 3

Jerald Honeycutt came up with his third consecutive double-double performance of 26 points and 13 rebounds while Pete Mickeal finished with 21 markers, four of which dealt the killer blows on the Thunder, Mickeal's short jumper and two free throws off a foul by Julius Nwosu capped a remarkable night for the Phone Pals.

Game 4

Willie Miller fended off the Phone Pals' last-ditch effort after sinking both of his free throws and knocking in a decisive triple in the final minute to save the Thunder from a total collapse after posting 20-point margins three-fourths of the way before the Phone Pals' uprising. Sean Lampley, who replaces Tony Lang on a short notice, finished with 22 points and 9 rebounds.

Game 5

A 25-10 run by the Phone Pals broke the 30-all count at halftime and allow them to settle comfortably on a 55-40 advantage entering the fourth quarter. The Thunder's miscues and lethargic plays in which the Phone Pals forced them to costly turnovers saw the previous lowest output in a championship game set by Alaska in 2000 were shattered as Red Bull finished the game with only 55 points.

Game 6

Donbel Belano, Gilbert Demape and Jerald Honeycutt made their shots from the outside as the Phone Pals' three-point shooting clicked to keep them ahead, 43-39, in the first half.

Game 7

Jimwell Torion drained a game-clinching triple with 1:31 left that found its mark and dashed the hopes of the Phone Pals, the tough defense put up by both teams resulted to an all-time low combined total of 127 points in the final game and the lowest winning output of 67 Willie Miller won on his first sophomore Finals MVP and Batang Red Bull captures on his 2 peat back to back champion title.

Roster

Broadcast notes

References

2002 PBA season
2002
TNT Tropang Giga games
Barako Bull Energy Boosters games
PBA Commissioner's Cup Finals